The 1994 All-Ireland Senior Camogie Championship was the high point of the 1994 season. The championship was won by Killkenny who defeated Wexford by a nine-point margin in the final. The match drew an attendance of 5,000.

Background
Angela Downey was coaxed out of retirement at the age of 37 by Kilkenny and her twin sister Ann Downey was named as captain and Kilkenny for the 1992 championship. Newcomers Michelle Fennelly, Sinéad Costello, Marie Maher and Una Murphy joined the squad. Galway easily beat Kildare in the quarter finals by 6–23 to 1–9 in St Conleth's Park.

Semi-finals
The returned Angela Downey proved the match-winner once more in the semi-final at Ballinlough, scoring three goals in a three-point victory 4–9 to 2–12. Fiona Dunne, sister of Wexford hurler, Liam Dunne, scored 2–10 for Wexford as they beat Galway in the second semi-final. Galway goalkeeper Tracey Laheen scored a goal from a wind assisted puck-out and Olivia Broderick added a second for Galway to lead by 2–2 to 0–3 after only ten minutes before Wexford took over and ran out easy winners by nine points, 3–14 to 2–5.

Final
Angela Downey earned her 12th All Ireland medals despite the Wexford strategy of trying to curb the Downey twins. Stellah Sinnott, in the words of Irish Times reporter Kathryn Davis, “stuck like a leech” to Angela in the opening ten minutes until a momentary lapse let her in for the first of two goals, flicked to the net despite the attention of three defenders from a Catherine Dunne pass. Wexford fought back from a 1–3 to 0-34 half time deficit to equalize nine minutes into the second half. A point three minutes later by substitute Brigid Barnaville gave Kilkenny the impetus they needed and a second Angela Downey goal in the final minute added a gloss to the scoreline.

Aftermath
Esme Murphy, a star on the Wexford minor team, was just 15 when she played in the All Ireland final. Wexford defeated Kilkenny by 2–9 to 1–10 in the Lienster final at Oylegate on 23 October, with goals by Angie Hearne and Paula Rankin.

Final stages

 
MATCH RULES
50 minutes
Replay if scores level
Maximum of 3 substitutions

See also
 All-Ireland Senior Hurling Championship
 Wikipedia List of Camogie players
 National Camogie League
 Camogie All Stars Awards
 Ashbourne Cup

References

External links
 Camogie Association
 All-Ireland Senior Camogie Championship: Roll of Honour
 Camogie on facebook
 Camogie on GAA Oral History Project

1994 in camogie
1994